Walter Bell may refer to:

 Walter A. Bell (1889–1969), Canadian geologist
 Walter Bell (businessman), American businessman
 W. Kamau Bell (Walter Kamau Bell, born 1973), American stand-up comic and television host
 W. D. M. Bell (Walter Dalrymple Maitland Bell, 1880–1951), Scottish adventurer
 Walter Leonard Bell MD FSAScot FRSE (1865–1932) surgeon and antiquarian